Gabriel Soler (born 10 March 1953) is a Spanish water polo player. He competed in the men's tournament at the 1972 Summer Olympics.

References

1953 births
Living people
Spanish male water polo players
Olympic water polo players of Spain
Water polo players at the 1972 Summer Olympics
Water polo players from Barcelona